Platyhypnidium is a genus of mosses belonging to the family Brachytheciaceae.

The genus has cosmopolitan distribution.

Species:
 Platyhypnidium aquaticum Fleischer, 1923 
 Platyhypnidium austrinum Fleischer, 1923

References

Hypnales
Moss genera